There are two species of gecko  named cotton ginner:

 Sphaerodactylus macrolepis
 Sphaerodactylus grandisquamis